Alienated is a Canadian science fiction television series. It was set and filmed in Victoria, British Columbia. The series premiered 8 July 2003 on Space and lasted for two seasons.

Mill Creek Entertainment released the complete series on DVD.

Synopsis 

The plot centers around the Blundells, a typical suburban family living in Victoria who undergo strange (often sexual) changes after being abducted by space aliens (who remain unseen throughout the series).

Characters 

It first aired in July 2003 and stars:
 Sarah-Jane Redmond as Sarah Blundell (Mother/wife)
 Campbell Lane as George Crickmore (Sarah's elderly father)
 Iris Graham as Isabelle Blundell (Daughter)
 Andrew Robb as Cameron Blundell (Fourteen-year-old Son)
 Jonathan Whittaker as Roger Blundell (Father/husband)

Guest stars 
 George Takei as himself
 Michaela Mann as Charlie Delgado
 Gabrielle Miller as Rebecca Myers

Episode listing

Season 1

Season 2

External links 
 

2000s Canadian drama television series
2003 Canadian television series debuts
2004 Canadian television series endings
2000s Canadian science fiction television series
Television shows filmed in Victoria, British Columbia